Woodah Island, also known as Isle Woodah, is an island in Arnhem Land, in the Northern Territory of Australia, lying in the mouth of Blue Mud Bay at . It is located 13.4 km east of Haddon Head on the coast of mainland Arnhem Land. It is 24 km long north-south, and up to 3.5 km wide.

It is known as the site of some of the killings in the Caledon Bay crisis, which marked a turning point in the relationship between Indigenous and non-Indigenous Australians.

References

Islands of the Northern Territory